The following is a timeline of the history of the city of Kyoto, Kyoto Prefecture, Honshu island, Japan.

Prior to 19th century

 794 CE - Kanmu relocates Japanese capital to Heian-kyō from Nagaoka-kyō.
 947 - Kitano Shrine built.
 970 - Gion Festival begins.
 1202 - Zen Buddhist Kennin-ji (temple) founded in Higashiyama by Eisai.
 1319 - Daitoku-ji Temple built.
 1397 - Kinkaku-ji (Temple of the Golden Pavilion) founded.
 1431 - Famine.
 1444 - Political protest by merchants, at Kitano Shrine.
 1467 - Ōnin War begins.
 1480 - Ikkō-ikki unrest.
 1560 - Aritsugu swordsmith in business.
 1586
 Jurakudai (palace) built.
 Hōkō-ji (temple) founded.
 Tenshō earthquake brings destruction and kills many.
 1788 - Great Kyoto Fire.

19th century
 1854 - Kyoto Imperial Palace rebuilt.
 1869 - Japanese imperial capital relocated from Kyoto to Tokyo.
 1871
 Tokyo-Osaka-Kyoto postal service begins.
 Kyoto Prefecture created.
 1872 - Exhibition of Arts and Manufactures held.
 1875 - Protestant Doshisha English School established.
 1877 - Kyōto Station opens.
 1879 - Kamigyō-ku and Shimogyō-ku ward established.
 1886 - Maruyama Park opens.
 1887 - Population: 264,559.
 1888 - Takocho (eatery) in business.
 1890 - Lake Biwa Canal built.
 1893 - Population: 317,270.
 1895
 Kyoto Electric Railway begins operating.
  held in Kyoto; Heian Shrine built.
 1897
 Imperial University of Kyoto established.
  religious newspaper begins publication.
 1899 - Kyoto Camera Club formed.
 1900 - Miyako Hotel in business.

20th century

 1903
 Kyoto Municipal Zoo established.
 Population: 379,404.
 1904 - Japan's first ekiben (boxed lunch) sold in Kyoto.
 1909
 Kyoto Commercial Museum opens.
 Population: 442,402.
 1913
 Hirase Conchological Museum opens.
 Population: 509,380.
 1918 - Population: 670,357.
 1921 - Higashiyama-ku ward created.
 1922 - Kyoto Sanga Football Club formed.
 1924 - Kyoto Botanical Garden established.
 1925
 December:  occurs.
 Population: 679,963.
 1928 - Hirohito's imperial enthronement ceremony held in Kyoto.
 1929
 Nakagyō-ku and Sakyō-ku wards created.
 City hosts Institute of Pacific Relations conference.
 1930 - Population: 765,142
 1931 - Fushimi-ku and Ukyō-ku wards created.
 1934 - Salon de thé François (café) opens.
 1940 - Population: 1,089,726.
 1942
 Kyoto Shimbun newspaper in publication.
 Nishikyogoku Athletic Stadium opens.
 1945 - Population: 866,153.
 1946 - November: National Sports Festival of Japan held in Kyoto.
 1950 - Population: 1,101,854.
 1955 - Kita-ku and Minami-ku wards created.
 1956 - Kyoto designated a government ordinance city.
 1960
 Kyoto Kaikan (concert hall) opens.
 National Christian Council Center for the Study of Japanese Religions founded.
 1964 - Kyoto Tower erected.
 1969 - Kyoto Computer Gakuin (school) established.
 1970 - October: Kyoto hosts World Conference of Religions for Peace.
 1975 - Population: 1,460,000.
 1976 - Nishikyō-ku and Yamashina-ku wards created.
 1981 - Kyoto Municipal Subway begins operating.
 1987 - City hosts World Conference of Historical Cities.
 1988 - Nettowāku Kyōto (magazine) in publication.
 1994 - Kyoto UNESCO World Heritage Site established.
 1995 - Kyoto Concert Hall opens.
 1996 - Yorikane Masumoto elected mayor.
 1997
 Kyōto Station rebuilt.
 City hosts signing of the Kyoto Protocol.
 2000
 Kyoto Art Center opens.
 Population: 1,467,705.

21st century

 2001 - Movix Kyoto (cinema) opens.
 2008 - February 17: 2008 Kyoto mayoral election held; Daisaku Kadokawa wins.
 2011 - Population: 1,473,746.
 2012 - February 5: 2012 Kyoto mayoral election held.

See also
 Kyoto history
 
 List of Buddhist temples in Kyoto
 List of Shinto shrines in Kyoto

References

This article incorporates information from the Japanese Wikipedia.

Bibliography

Published in the 17th-19th centuries
  (guidebook)
 
  circa 1835
 

Published in the 20th century
 
 
 
 
 
 
 Richard Ponsonby-Fane. (1956). Kyoto: The Old Capital of Japan, 794-1869. Kyoto: The Ponsonby Memorial Society.
 
 
 
 

Published in the 21st century

External links

  + part 2
 Maps of Kyoto, circa 1945
 Items related to Kyoto, various dates (via Europeana).
 Images related to Kyoto, various dates (via New York Public Library)
 Items related to Kyoto, various dates (via Digital Public Library of America).

Kyoto
History of Kyoto
Years in Japan